Arkansas Highway 210 (AR 210 and Hwy. 210) is a designation for two east–west state highways in Cleburne County, Arkansas. One segment of  runs in Heber Springs from Greers Ferry Lake east to Heber Springs Road (Highway 25B) as Case Ford Road. A second segment begins at Highway 110 and runs northeast as Industrial Park Rd.

Route description

Case Ford Road segment
The route begins at the shores of Greers Ferry Lake and runs south to terminate at Heber Springs Road (Highway 25B). The route is two-lane, undivided for its entire length.

Industrial Park Road segment
Highway 210 begins at Highway 110 and runs northeast to terminate at Cow Shoals Lane.

History
Highway 210 first appeared in the 1959 Arkansas state highway map. The route ran from Highway 110 west of Heber Springs to the northeast. The Arkansas State Highway Commission later extended Highway 210 "to provide public access to Greers Ferry Lake". The segment from Heber Springs to Greers Ferry Lake was added prior to 1970.

Major intersections

|-
| align=center colspan=4| Highway 210 eastern segment begins outside Heber Springs
|-

See also

 List of state highways in Arkansas

References

External links

210
Transportation in Cleburne County, Arkansas